Xi Xiaobo (1910–1977) was a Peking opera singer.


Life
Xi was best known for his "old man" roles  lǎoshēng) and was considered one of Peking Opera's "Four Great Beards"   , along with Tan Fuying, Yang Baosen, and Ma Lianliang. He served as a mentor to Li Yuru.

References

Citations

Bibliography
 .

External links
 "奚啸伯" on Baike.com 

1910 births
1977 deaths
20th-century Chinese  male singers
20th-century Chinese male actors
Male actors from Beijing
Singers from Beijing
Chinese male Peking opera actors